Houssem Eddine Mrezigue (born 23 March 2000) is an Algerian international footballer who plays for CR Belouizdad in the Algerian Ligue Professionnelle 1.

International career
He made his debut for the Algeria national football team on 1 December 2021 in a 2021 FIFA Arab Cup game against Sudan.

Honours
CR Belouizdad
Algerian Ligue Professionnelle 1: 2020–21
Algerian Super Cup: 2019

Algeria
FIFA Arab Cup: 2021

References

External links
 

2000 births
Living people
Algerian footballers
Algeria international footballers
Association football midfielders
ES Sétif players
MC Alger players
CR Belouizdad players
21st-century Algerian people
Algeria A' international footballers
2022 African Nations Championship players